The R352 is a Regional Route in South Africa that connects Dimbaza with Tsomo via Stutterheim.

Its south-western terminus is the R63 at Dimbaza. From there, it heads north to Keiskammahoek. The route then heads east-north-east to Stutterheim, where it crosses the N6. It then runs north-east to Tsomo where it ends at the R409.

External links
 Routes Travel Info

References

Regional Routes in the Eastern Cape